Chiu Yi-ying (born 1 June 1971) is a Taiwanese politician. She has served four terms in the Legislative Yuan, one term in the National Assembly, and, from 2005 to 2008, was the deputy minister of the Hakka Affairs Council.

Education
Chiu earned a master's in business administration from the Dominican University of California in the United States.

Political career
A member of the Democratic Progressive Party, Chiu had been elected to the Central Standing Committee by 2000. In 2016, she became chair of the committee.

Chiu won her first national-level office in 1996, serving on the National Assembly until 2000. Upon taking office, Chiu became the youngest assembly member at age 25. In 2001, she was elected to the Legislative Yuan as a representative of Pingtung County. Chiu was then appointed deputy minister of the Hakka Affairs Council in June 2005. Chiu was placed on the Democratic Progressive Party's proportional representation party list for the 2008 legislative elections and won, necessitating her resignation from the Hakka Affairs Council, where she was replaced by Peng Tien-fu. In 2012, Chiu defeated Kaohsiung 1 incumbent Chung Shao-ho and won reelection in 2016.

Controversy
Chiu supported a 2003 amendment to Taiwanese copyright law that was unpopular with rapper Jeff Huang. Huang wrote a song titled "Retribution" about the amendment's supporters, two of whom, Chiu and Chang Hsueh-shun, sued him for libel. The Taipei District Court ruled in May 2007 that Huang was not guilty of libel.

Chiu has been involved in many altercations on the floor of the Legislative Yuan. In April 2009, Lee Ching-hua called Chiu a shrew, and in response, she hit him. In another instance, Chiu attempted to unplug a loudspeaker Kuomintang legislators were using to disrupt a review of the Cross-Strait Service Trade Agreement, while Chiang Kui-fang tried to stop her. While meeting as a member of the legislature's economics committee in November 2016, Chiu was overheard saying there was "no use talking to these huan-a," using a derogatory Hokkien word to refer to Kuomintang aboriginal representatives. She later apologized. In July 2017, Chiu attempted to break up a group of Kuomintang lawmakers who were protesting the Forward-looking Infrastructure Development Program. Hsu Shu-hua slapped Chiu across the face. Chiu responded by pulling her hair. Chiu later engaged , Lin Te-fu, and Huang Chao-shun.

Personal life and family
Chiu's grandfather Chiu Ching-te was a member of the Pingtung County Assembly and served two terms as Pingtung City mayor. Her father, was elected to the Pingtung County Council, and, in 1977, bid for the mayoralty of Pingtung, before withdrawing from the Kuomintang and abandoning the campaign. Another relative, Chiu Lien-hui, was active Pingtung County politics from 1959 to 1996. Chiu Yi-ying's younger brother  is also a politician.

Chiu Yi-ying married Lee Yung-te in April 2011, whom she had met while serving on the Hakka Affairs Council. Later that year, she was diagnosed with ovarian cancer. To maintain her health, Chiu began jogging, juicing, and cut red meat from her diet. In January 2013, Chiu and Lee held their wedding banquet, which had been postponed due to the 2012 election cycle and Chiu's cancer treatment.

References

1971 births
Living people
Pingtung County Members of the Legislative Yuan
Party List Members of the Legislative Yuan
Democratic Progressive Party Members of the Legislative Yuan
Kaohsiung Members of the Legislative Yuan
Members of the 5th Legislative Yuan
Members of the 7th Legislative Yuan
Members of the 8th Legislative Yuan
Members of the 9th Legislative Yuan
Dominican University of California alumni
Women government ministers of Taiwan
Taiwanese politicians of Hakka descent
Members of the 10th Legislative Yuan